The 1st Foreign Parachute Heavy Mortar Company was an ephemeral foreign airborne heavy mortar company of the Foreign Legion which fought during the First Indochina War at the corps of the French Far East Expeditionary Corps.

History 

In August 1953, lieutenant Jacques Molinier serves in the 1st Vietnamese Parachute Battalion (1er BPVN). Accordingly, he is tasked by the headquarters of Hanoi to form a heavy mortar parachute combat company integrated in the French Foreign Legion and based in Tonkin. Created on September 1, 1953, based on elements, mainly artillery specialist of the 1st Foreign Parachute Battalion (1er B.E.P) and 2nd Foreign Parachute Battalion (2e B.E.P); the created combat company is administratively attached to the 1st Foreign Parachute Battalion (1er B.E.P). The rear base of the company is situated at Quynh Loï, South of Hanoï.

The first operation launched by the 1st Foreign Parachute Heavy Mortar Company (1re C.E.P.M.L) was to support of the 1st and 2nd Foreign Parachute Battalions. The company also made a combat jump alongside Chef de Battalion Marcel Bigeard's 6th Colonial Parachute Battalion.

On November 21, 1953, Lieutenant Molinier jumped on Dien Bien Phu with the first wave of Operation Castor, at the border Landing Zone (L.Z) Natacha. at 1500, 67 enlisted and officers, as well as 8 Brandt 120mm mortars and 800 rounds of ammunition are dropped on the landing zone. At 1600, the company was in position to fire. This company is the first heavy 120mm mortar unit to be dropped in an airborne operation. The 1st Foreign Parachute Heavy Mortar Company had packed the mortars in alvéoles type compartments about 3 to 4 meters in diameter. Following the drop, the company received another drop of a supplementary 4 120mm mortars to make the total count of 12 120mm mortars available with 99 officers, warrant officers, non-commissioned officers and legionnaires.

On March 12, 1954, Lieutenant Molinier was wounded during a recon operation conducted with the 1st Foreign Parachute Battalion 1er BEP on “Béatrice”. Wounded by a dozen of pieces of shrapnel in the back and face, he is carried to the underground hospital of commandant-doctor Paul-Henri Grauwin, who had him evacuated by plane to Hanoi. For the officer, the Battle of Dien Bien Phu is over. Molinier passes command of the company to Lieutenant Paul Turcy who is killed on March 14, 1954. Accordingly, Lieutenant Erwan Bergot assumes interim command of the company until the parachute support of Lieutenant Jean Singland. On May 7, 1954, the final assault commenced and the French Foreign Legion fired their mortars in all directions during the defence.

On June 1, the 1st Foreign Parachute Heavy Mortar Company was dissolved. In its eight-month existence, the company fired more than 30,000 rounds and endured heavy losses: 24 killed, 43 wounded. At the liberation of the prisoners from the Viet-minh camps, only 17 had survived. Following the dissolution of the company, Lieutenant Molinier assumed command of the Command and Support Company (C.C.S) of the 1st Foreign Parachute Battalion (1er B.E.P).

Organization

Traditions

Insignias 
The insignia of the Foreign Legion Paratroopers of France represents a closed "winged armed dextrochere", meaning a "right winged arm" armed with a sword pointing upwards. The Insignia makes reference to the Patron of Paratroopers. In fact, the Insignia represents "the right Arm of Saint Michael", the Archangel which according to Liturgy is the "Armed Arm of God". This Insignia is the symbol of righteous combat and fidelity to superior missions.

Company Colors

Company Song

Decorations

Honours

Battle honours

Company Commander 

 1953 - 1954 : Lieutenant Molinier
 1954 - 1954 : Lieutenant Turcy
 1954 - 1954 : Lieutenant Erwan Bergot
 1954 - 1954 : Lieutenant Singland

Notable Officers and Legionnaires

See also 

 Major (France)

References 

 Braby, Wayne & Windrow, Martin. French Foreign Legion Paratroops. London: Osprey Publishing, 1985. 
 Collectif, Histoire des parachutistes français, Société de Production Littéraire, 1975.
 Jean Brunon et Georges Manue, Le livre d’or de la Légion étrangère (1831-1955), éditions Charles Lavauzelle et Cie, 1958.
 Pierre Montagnon, Les parachutistes de la Légion 1948-1962, éditions Pygmalion, 2005, .

Airborne units and formations of France
Military units and formations established in 1953
Military units and formations disestablished in 1954
Parachute Heavy Mortar Company, 1st Foreign
Company sized units